John V. Risman (birth registered fourth ¼ 1944) is the President of Scotland Rugby League, and a former professional rugby league footballer who played in the 1970s and 1980s.

Background
John Risman's birth was registered in Salford district, Lancashire, in the early 1980s, John Risman was a teacher of Geography and Physical education at Salterbeck School in Workington.

Playing career

International honours
John Risman won 3 caps for Wales in 1978–1979 while at Workington Town.

County Cup Final appearances
John Risman played right-, i.e. number 3, in Workington Town's 16-13 victory over Wigan in the 1977 Lancashire County Cup Final during the 1977–78 season at Wilderspool Stadium, Warrington on Saturday 29 October 1977, and played right-, i.e. number 3, in the 13-15 defeat by Widnes in the 1978 Lancashire County Cup Final during the 1978–79 season at Central Park, Wigan on Saturday 7 October 1978.

Coaching
John coached the Serbia national rugby league team for 3 matches in the 2004 Mediterranean Cup; losing to Lebanon and France, but getting a 20-20 draw with Morocco

Genealogical information
John Risman is the son of the rugby league footballer Gus Risman, and the younger brother of the rugby union, and rugby league footballer Bev Risman.

References

External links

1944 births
Living people
Barrow Raiders players
Blackpool Borough players
Carlisle RLFC players
English people of Welsh descent
English rugby league coaches
English rugby league players
London Broncos players
Rugby league centres
Rugby league fullbacks
Rugby league players from Salford
Serbia national rugby league team coaches
Wales national rugby league team players
Workington Town players